Ochil may refer to:

 Ochil (Scottish Parliament constituency)
 Ochil (UK Parliament constituency), county constituency, 1997–2005
 Ochil and South Perthshire (UK Parliament constituency), created in 2005
 Ochil Hills, a range of hills in Scotland 
 Ochil Fault, defines the southern edge of the Ochil Hills